Sigurdur Ingi Thordarson (born 1992), commonly known as Siggi hakkari ("Siggi the Hacker"), is an Icelandic convicted criminal and FBI informant against WikiLeaks. He is known for information leaks, multiple cases of fraud and embezzlement, sexual solicitation of minors and adults. He has multiple convictions for sexual offences.

In 2010, at the age of 17, he was arrested for stealing and leaking classified information about Icelandic financial companies. After his arrest, he was introduced to Julian Assange, the editor and founder of WikiLeaks, and worked as a volunteer for the organization between 2010 and 2011. In 2011, as several charges were brought against him, Thordarson contacted the FBI and offered to become an informant, turning over numerous internal WikiLeaks documents and hard drives in the process. WikiLeaks accused him of having embezzled $50,000 from the WikiLeaks online store to which he pleaded guilty along with other economic crimes against other entities. He was also accused of using Julian Assange's name in legal documents. 

In June 2021, in an interview with Icelandic newspaper Stundin, Thordarson recanted some of the previous accusations he had made against Julian Assange. Stundin said the accusations were used in the American indictment against Assange, but The Washington Post disagreed.

Information leaks
Thordarson began leaking information about the Icelandic banking system to the media in late 2009. This included information about individuals in the Icelandic banking system, information that showed that individuals were committing illegal acts in relation to banking. One of the leaks by Thordarson concerned a case called "Vafningsmálið." It involved Bjarni Benediktsson during his time as an MP. Bjarni reported that the case was only a political smear campaign. The information published by Icelandic news media obtained from Thordarson also showed that one of the country's biggest football stars, Eiður Guðjohnsen, was deeply indebted and almost bankrupt.

After the information was published, Eiður sued the local newspaper DV for publishing this information. DV lost the case in a lower court, but won an appeal to the Supreme Court of Iceland, stating that the information was a matter for the public. Amongst other information that Thordarson admitted to have leaked in an interview with the Rolling Stone magazine was information about local businessman Karl Wernersson. He was the owner of the Milestone ehf that was the investment company from which Thordarson stole most of the information. Other names in the documents leaked by Thordarson included information about Birkir Kristinsson, who had recently been convicted of economic crimes while working for Glitnir bank. Some speculate that information from Thordarson was used as evidence in that case, Thordarson also leaked a classified report about one of the bigger aluminum plants in Iceland. The report stated that the plant was paying 1/4 of what other aluminum plants in the world are paying for electricity.

Other information leaked by Thordarson contained information about other local business men such as Gunnar Gunnarsson, who also has been reported to assist football star Cristiano Ronaldo in tax affairs. In 2013, Thordarson argued with Birgitta Jónsdóttir on Twitter over the release of the loanbooks of the Glitnir Bank. Thordarson said she had no involvement, but he claimed that he had given her the files years ago. In 2009, Thordarson arrived at the offices of the Special Prosecutor, who investigated the bank collapse in Iceland in 2008. Thordarson reportedly gave them all the information he had on Milestone and other local business men, however instead of using some of the information obtained from Thordarson in investigation the investigators decided to sell the information. The case against the two police officers was later dismissed, and it has been reported that the investigators made roughly 30 Million ISK ($250.000) from the documents. In January 2010, Thordarson was arrested on suspicion of stealing classified information, that case never reached the court system and Thordarson denied his involvement until the Rolling Stone interview. Thordarson was only seventeen years old when he was arrested for leaking the information.

WikiLeaks and FBI connections
Birgitta Jónsdóttir, a former WikiLeaks volunteer and member of the Icelandic parliament who worked on Collateral Murder, described Julian Assange's relationship with Thordarson as like "Batman and Robin." In a few weeks, Thordarson was in Assange's inner circle. According to one former volunteer, "the perception was that Siggi basically got to a level where Julian trusted him in a matter of days."Assange directly gave Thordarson an encrypted cell phone, and involved him in the Collateral Murder project. Assange asked Thordarson to write psychological profiles of core WikiLeaks members. Thordarson performed additional surveillance and copied their hard drives.

David Kushner, who interviewed Thordarson for the Rolling Stone, claimed that Thordarson provided Rolling Stone with over 1 terabyte of data about WikiLeaks, including thousands of pages of chat logs, videos, tapped phone calls, government documents. Kushner said that either Thordarson was the real deal or this was the biggest and most elaborate lie in the digital age, and that Assange's affidavit validated the importance of Siggi’s documents.

Former WikiLeaks employee James Ball has claimed Thordarson reported directly to Assange and served as WikiLeaks' contact with hacker groups. Kevin Poulsen, has stated that Thordarson began working for WikiLeaks as early as February 2010 and was fired in November 2011; he acknowledges that Thordarson is "prone to lying". Several of WikiLeaks' core volunteers saw Siggi as a dangerous liability, prone to indiscretions and lies. Kristinn Hrafnsson, spokesman for WikiLeaks, claims Thordarson was only a volunteer for the WikiLeaks organization for a few months between 2010 and 2011 where Thordarson took part in moderating a chat room, vetting potential allies and sources. 

Thordarson sold T-shirts on an unauthorised WikiLeaks online store, from which he embezzled $50,000, the money was paid into his own bank account and the official reason why he was fired.

In August 2011, Thordarson contacted the United States Embassy in Reykjavik and claimed he had information about an ongoing criminal investigation in the United States, and requested a meeting. Thordarson was then summoned to the embassy, where he gave diplomatic staff official documents showing that he was who he claimed to be. Thordarson said he was motivated by a fear of the US judicial system and disagreement over how WikiLeaks acquired information. He also said he gave them 1 TB of data, but "they didn’t know about the extra 2TB" and that he refused to wear a wire to record Assange.

The day after the meeting with the embassy official the FBI sent a private jet with eight federal agents and a prosecutor to question Thordarson. The FBI gave Icelandic authorities notice that they were questioning Thordarson in relation to an co-investigation that Anonymous and LulzSec were about to infiltrate Icelandic government systems. After the authorities found out Thordarson was also being questioned about WikiLeaks, the FBI was asked to leave Iceland. The FBI left the country a few days later. Thordarson went with them to Denmark where questioning continued.

Thordarson was subsequently returned to Iceland. In 2012, he met with the federal agents on multiple occasions, and was flown to Copenhagen where Thordarson was provided a room in a luxury hotel. Thordarson was allowed to return to Iceland after every meeting. Thordarson met with the FBI again in Washington D.C. and spent a couple of days with them there. The final meeting that Thordarson said took place with the FBI was during a course Thordarson was enrolled in at Aarhus in Denmark, teaching IT Security. Thordarson met with the agents there and handed over several hard drives he had copied from Assange and core WikiLeaks members.

Wired reported Thordarson had received $5,000 for his assistance. 

Thordarson said that in February 2013, he told Kristinn Hrafnsson, Ingi Ingason and a third WikiLeaks staff member that he was an FBI informant and gave them the 3TB trove. In 2013, Thordarson was also summoned to the General Committee of the Icelandic Parliament after days of being discussed in the Parliament. They questioned Thordarson about his involvement in the FBI case. The then-Minister of the Interior Ögmundur Jónasson said in Parliament that Thordarson was young and the FBI meant him to be a "spy" within the WikiLeaks organization.

In June 2021, in an interview with Icelandic newspaper Stundin, Thordarson recanted previous statements that he had made about Julian Assange, now claiming, for example, that Assange never instructed him to "hack or access" phone recordings of Icelandic MPs. He said that he misrepresented himself as an official representative of WikiLeaks. In May 2019, he signed an immunity agreement with US prosecutors in exchange for information. He is referred to as 'Teenager' in the indictment against Assange. Several news organisations, including The Hill, Deutsche Welle, Der Spiegel, Berliner Zeitung and The Intercept described Thordarson as being a chief or key witness in the case. Deutsche Welle said "the key witness, Icelandic national Sigurd Ingi Thordarson, had admitted to fabricating incriminating testimony against Assange in return for immunity from prosecution". Over ten days after the Stundin article, The Washington Post said Thordarson's testimony was not used as the basis for charges but for information on Assange's contact with Chelsea Manning.

Icelandic Parliament "Spy Computer"
In January 2011, it was reported in the Icelandic media that a computer had been found within closed sections of the Parliament. It was alleged that WikiLeaks was suspected of placing the computer inside the Parliament. Bjarni Benediktsson the MP Thordarson leaked information about comments found on the computer.

Thordarson was questioned about his involvement in this case. Morgunblaðið, Iceland's largest newspaper published on the front page on 31 January 2011 that a local reporter for the paper DV was suspected of obtaining the information from Thordarson. The reporter was said to be under investigation for receiving the information from Thordarson and manipulating Thordarson into leaking the information and placing the computer inside Parliament. The reporter sued the newspaper for libel and won the case. Morgunblaðið withdrew the report and issued an apology to the reporter on 7 December. 

A later report in the Icelandic media stated that specialists were checking whether parliament phones were spied on by WikiLeaks. Wired published chat logs that indicated they got copies of phone call recordings. Some Icelandic papers have connected the phone call recordings that WikiLeaks allegedly got to "Spy Computer" scandal. Birgitta Jónsdóttir issued a statement stating that she had never heard of any recordings.

As of 2016, the case was still under investigation with no official suspects.

In a June 2021 interview with Icelandic media Stundin, Thordarson said that Assange did not ask him to hack or record phone calls of the MPs. Thordarson claimed that he was given files from someone who claimed to have recorded the MPs and that he offered to share them with Assange without checking the files.

Anonymous and LulzSec 
During his period at WikiLeaks, it has also been reported that Thordarson ordered attacks on Icelandic governmental infrastructures such as the servers hosting the Ministry's websites www.stjornarradid.is and www.landsnet.is. Those DDoS attacks were successful for a few hours. This was all done after an Icelandic business man that owns an Icelandic data center asked Thordarson to do so. It has also been reported that Thordarson ordered Hector Monsegur (Sabu) and his team to attack Icelandic State Police servers. This all happened during Sabu's time as an FBI informant. It is reported that Thordarson obtained the unpublished version of a report about the surveillance unit at the U.S Embassy in Reykjavik. 

Media sources have indicated that persons part of Anonymous and LulzSec reported to Thordarson. Reports state that Thordarson obtained many leaks through this method that WikiLeaks later published, such as The Kissinger cables and The Syria Files. It is unknown how WikiLeaks or Thordarson obtained the information, though chat logs between Thordarson and Hector Monsegur a.k.a. Sabu have surfaced.

Arrests and convictions
In 2012, Thordarson was questioned about sexual misconduct, accused of deceiving a seventeen-year-old teenage boy. At the time, Thordarson was 18 years old. Thordarson denied the charges but was found guilty in late 2013 and received 8 months in prison.

In 2012, WikiLeaks filed criminal charges against Thordarson for embezzlement. Thordarson denied the charges and the case was later dismissed. He was later arrested in the summer of 2013 on charges of financial fraud. At that time, the WikiLeaks case was brought back up, and Thordarson was indicted on charges of embezzlement and financial fraud. In 2014, Thordarson was ordered to pay WikiLeaks 7 million ISK (roughly $55,000) as well as being sentenced to prison for 2 years for embezzlement and financial fraud. Thordarson pled guilty to all counts. In those cases Thordarson was ordered to pay the victims 15 million ISK (roughly $115.000), Thordarson received a two-year prison sentence in those cases.

In 2012, Thordarson was arrested for allegedly having tried to blackmail a large Icelandic candy factory, but the case was later dismissed.

In January 2014, Thordarson was again arrested for sex crimes. He was believed to be a potential flight risk as well as being likely to sabotage the investigation against him and therefore placed in solitary confinement. Thordarson had said he would offer flight tickets, Land Rovers, and up to a million dollars in exchange for sexual favours. The victims ranged from the age of 15–20, all male, during which Thordarson was 18–21. A psychiatric evaluation ruled that Thordarson was of sound mind, but that he had an antisocial personality disorder and was incapable of feeling remorse for his actions. Thordarson pled guilty to all counts and received 3 years for that.

Thordarson was ordered to pay 8.6 million ISK (roughly $66,000) in damages to his victims. In 2014, he was sentenced to pay roughly $236,000 in damages for various economic crimes and frauds, including having swindled fast-food companies, car rentals, electronics shops, and having tricked someone into giving him all his shares in a book publishing company. In September 2015 he was sentenced to three years' imprisonment for having sex with nine underage boys, after confessing to the crime the previous month. The victims were offered payment or some other form of inducement. A court ordered criminal forensic psychiatric evaluation diagnosed him with antisocial personality disorder.

In September 2021, on the day he returned to Iceland from a trip to Spain, Thordarson was arrested and imprisoned. He is being held indefinitely under an Icelandic law enabling the detention of individuals believed to be active in ongoing crimes. According to Stundin, the cases leading to his arrest involved financial fraud.

In 2021, new details became public. These included allegations from one of his victims that Thordarson assaulted him more than the 40 times the court judgment said. According to the victim, Thordarson had weapons and threatened him and his family over a 2-3 year period, and used pepper spray and a stun gun on him. Thordarson recorded a video of him and the victim, which the police came into possession of and led to them learning more.

Media portrayals 
The film The Fifth Estate (2013), with Benedict Cumberbatch as Assange, features a character based on Thordarson's played by Jamie Blackley. Thordarson is mentioned in Domscheit-Berg's book, during his time with WikiLeaks he reportedly used the handles PenguinX, Singi201 and "Q".

References

1992 births
Living people
People from Reykjavík
WikiLeaks
Icelandic prisoners and detainees
Prisoners and detainees of Iceland
People convicted of fraud
People convicted of sex crimes